Runestone U 582 is a runestone formerly located by the church of Söderby-Karl, Norrtälje municipality, in the Roslagen area on the east coast of Sweden. It has been lost since some time before 1830. The runestone has been dated to the 11th century and includes what is probably the earliest known written mention of Finland.

Inscription 
ᛒᛁᛅᚱᚾ᛫ᛅᚢᚴ᛫ᛁᚴᚢᛚᚠᚱᛁᚦ᛬ᚱᛅᛁᛋᛏᚢ᛫ᛋᛏᛅᛁᚾ᛬ᛅᚠᛏᛦ᛬ᚢᛏᚱᛁᚴ᛬ᛋᚢᚾ᛬ᛋᛅᛁᚾ᛬ᚼᛅᚾ᛬ᚢᛅᛦ᛫ᛏᚱᛁᛒᛁᚾ᛬ᚭ᛫ᚠᛁᚾ᛫ᛚᚭᚾᛏᛁ

biarn auk * ikulfriþ : raistu : stain : aftʀ : utrik : sun : sain * han * uaʀ : tribin : o * fin*lonti

Translation in old west Norse: Bjǫrn ok Ígulfríðr reistu stein eptir Ótrygg, son sinn. Hann var drepinn á Finnlandi.

Translation in English: Bjǫrn and Ígulfríðr raised the stone in memory of Ótryggr, their son. He was killed in Finland.

See also
List of runestones

References

U582
Archaeological sites in Sweden
Prehistory of Sweden
Viking Age in Sweden